Hermin Joseph (born 13 April 1964) is a retired Dominican sprinter. She was the first woman to represent Dominica at the Olympics.

Her greatest international achievement was a sixth place at the 1994 Commonwealth Games in Victoria, British Columbia, Canada. At the World Championships she reached the quarter-finals of the 200 metres competition in 1993 and of the 100 metres competition in 1995.

She also competed at the 1996 Summer Olympics, which was the first Olympic participation of the Caribbean country.

References

1964 births
Living people
Dominica female sprinters
Athletes (track and field) at the 1996 Summer Olympics
Olympic athletes of Dominica
Athletes (track and field) at the 1994 Commonwealth Games
Commonwealth Games competitors for Dominica
World Athletics Championships athletes for Dominica
Olympic female sprinters